Claudia Ștef, née Iovan (born 25 February 1978 in Craiova, Romania) is a Romanian women's professional race walker.

Ștef holds the world indoor record for 3000 metres track walk with 11:40.33 minutes, achieved in January 1999 in Bucharest.

Doping 
She tested positive for nandrolone in an out-of-competition test on 20 May 2000 and received a two-year doping ban.

Achievements

See also
List of doping cases in athletics

References

External links 

1978 births
Living people
Romanian female racewalkers
Doping cases in athletics
Romanian sportspeople in doping cases
Athletes (track and field) at the 2012 Summer Olympics
Athletes (track and field) at the 2016 Summer Olympics
Olympic athletes of Romania
World Athletics Championships athletes for Romania
World Athletics indoor record holders
Universiade medalists in athletics (track and field)
Universiade gold medalists for Romania
Medalists at the 1999 Summer Universiade